Elections to Newry and Mourne District Council were held on 19 May 1993 on the same day as the other Northern Irish local government elections. The election used five district electoral areas to elect a total of 30 councillors.

Election results

Note: "Votes" are the first preference votes.

Districts summary

|- class="unsortable" align="centre"
!rowspan=2 align="left"|Ward
! % 
!Cllrs
! % 
!Cllrs
! %
!Cllrs
! %
!Cllrs
! % 
!Cllrs
!rowspan=2|TotalCllrs
|- class="unsortable" align="center"
!colspan=2 bgcolor="" | SDLP
!colspan=2 bgcolor="" | UUP
!colspan=2 bgcolor="" | Sinn Féin
!colspan=2 bgcolor="" | DUP
!colspan=2 bgcolor="white"| Others
|-
|align="left"|Crotlieve
|bgcolor="#99FF66"|58.6
|bgcolor="#99FF66"|4
|12.1
|1
|4.8
|0
|0.0
|0
|24.5
|2
|7
|-
|align="left"|Newry Town
|bgcolor="#99FF66"|43.7
|bgcolor="#99FF66"|3
|11.2
|1
|22.8
|2
|0.0
|0
|22.3
|1
|7
|-
|align="left"|Slieve Gullion
|bgcolor="#99FF66"|54.0
|bgcolor="#99FF66"|3
|0.0
|0
|46.0
|2
|0.0
|0
|0.0
|0
|5
|-
|align="left"|The Fews
|bgcolor="#99FF66"|44.7
|bgcolor="#99FF66"|3
|36.5
|2
|18.8
|1
|0.0
|0
|0.0
|0
|6
|-
|align="left"|The Mournes
|36.8
|2
|bgcolor="40BFF5"|46.8
|bgcolor="40BFF5"|2
|3.6
|0
|12.8
|1
|0.0
|0
|5
|- class="unsortable" class="sortbottom" style="background:#C9C9C9"
|align="left"| Total
|47.9
|15
|20.9
|6
|18.1
|5
|2.3
|1
|10.8
|3
|30
|-
|}

District results

Crotlieve

1989: 5 x SDLP, 1 x UUP, 1 x Independent Nationalist
1993: 4 x SDLP, 2 x Independent Nationalist, 1 x UUP
1989-1993 Change: Independent Nationalist gain from SDLP

Newry Town

1989: 4 x SDLP, 1 x Sinn Féin, 1 x UUP, 1 x Independent Nationalist
1993: 3 x SDLP, 2 x Sinn Féin, 1 x UUP, 1 x Independent
1989-1993 Change: Sinn Féin and Independent gain from SDLP and Independent Nationalist

Slieve Gullion

1989: 3 x SDLP, 2 x Sinn Féin
1993: 3 x SDLP, 2 x Sinn Féin
1989-1993 Change: No change

The Fews

1989: 3 x SDLP, 2 x UUP, 1 x Sinn Féin
1993: 3 x SDLP, 2 x UUP, 1 x Sinn Féin
1989-1993 Change: No change

The Mournes

1989: 2 x UUP, 2 x SDLP, 1 x Protestant Unionist
1993: 2 x UUP, 2 x SDLP, 1 x DUP
1989-1993 Change: DUP gain from Protestant Unionist

References

Newry and Mourne District Council elections
Newry and Mourne